Al-Qādisiyyah may refer to:

Places
 Al-Qādisiyyah (historical city), the name of a historical city in southern Mesopotamia, along an important trade route
 Al-Qādisiyyah Governorate, a province in southern Iraq, with its capital at Ad-Diwāniyyah
 Al-Qādisiyyah, Kuwait, a suburb of Kuwait City
 Lake Qadisiyah, a man-made reservoir in Al-Anbar, Iraq

Sports
 Al-Qadisiya Al Khubar, a Saudi Arabian football (soccer) team
 Al Qadisiya Kuwait, a Kuwaiti football (soccer) team
 Shabab Al Ordon Al Qadisiya, a football (soccer) club based in Zarqa, Jordan

Other
 Battle of al-Qādisiyyah, a c. 636 CE engagement between the Sāsānian Empire and the Arab-Muslim invaders
 University of Al-Qadisiyah, Al Diwaniyah, Qadisiyyah Province, Iraq

See also
 Modern usage of al-Qādisiyyah